Back Track is a first-person shooter that was released for Windows PC in 1998 and for the Game Boy Advance in 2001. It is notable for being the first 3D shooter to be released on the Game Boy Advance (along with Doom).

Story 
Domingoaniax, an evil alien, has built up a large invasion force on the dark side of the Moon. The player assumes the role of special agent Jim Track, who has to rescue the 110 kidnapped humans and defeat Domingoaniax's droid army.

Game Boy Advance version

Multiplayer 
BackTrack's multiplayer mode has six deathmatch arenas, each playable as a standard 20-point deathmatch or as a 4-point round-robin. Both modes support up to four players via a link cable.

Reception 
IGN praised the game for its solid framerate, but noted that the story at times "Doesn't work", and that the humor was "groan-worthy". The game was panned in the press for being mediocre in comparison with other FPS games released around the same time. It had an average rating of 56% on GameRankings.

Reviews
Pocket Magazine / Pockett Videogames
All Game Guide
GameSpot

References

External links
 Back Track at GameRankings
 Back Track at IGN
Back Track at Metacritic

1998 video games
First-person shooters
Game Boy Advance games
JV Games games
Multiplayer and single-player video games
Video games developed in the United States
Video games set on the Moon
Windows games
Sprite-based first-person shooters
Telegames games